Andy Macpherson (born 6 April 1982) is a former professional rugby union referee who represented the Scottish Rugby Union. He now assesses referees internationally and is a Referee Development Manager with the SRU in Scotland.

Rugby union career

Referee career

Professional career

Macpherson joined the West of Scotland Referees Society.

He refereed in the Celtic League.

Macpherson won SRU referee of the season in 2008-09.

He refereed his first 1872 Cup match on 27 December 2010.

He now is a Regional Referee Development Manager to bring on new referees.

International career

He now assesses referees at an international level.

References

Living people
Scottish rugby union referees
Rugby union officials
1982 births
1872 Cup referees